Vanitha is an Indian magazine. It may also refer to:

People
Vanitha Krishnachandran, an Indian actress and comedienne in Malayalam, Tamil, Kannada, and Telugu cinema
Vanitha Vijayakumar, an Indian actress in Tamil cinema
Vanitha Rangaraju, an Indian animator who works for DreamWorks Animation

Other uses